The Tempi Madonna is an oil painting by the Italian High Renaissance painter Raphael. Painted for the Tempi family, it was bought by Ludwig I of Bavaria in 1829. It is housed in the Alte Pinakothek in Munich. It is thought to have been made in 1508, at the end of the artist's Florentine period.

See also
List of paintings by Raphael

Notes

References

External links

Paintings of the Madonna and Child by Raphael
Collection of the Alte Pinakothek
1508 paintings
Nude art